Sibal is an Indian (Khatri) surname. Notable people with the surname include:
 Hira Lall Sibal, Indian lawyer
 Kanwal Sibal (born 1943), Indian diplomat
 Kapil Sibal (born 1948), Indian politician
 Nina Sibal (1948 - 2000), Indian diplomat

See also
 Sibal (car), Korean car brand
 Basic Element (company), until 2001 known as Siberian Aluminum

Surnames
Indian surnames
Surnames of Indian origin
Punjabi-language surnames
Hindu surnames
Khatri clans
Khatri surnames